Michaiah Shobek (born James Michael Shoffner; 1954 – October 19, 1976), known as The Angels of Lucifer Killer, was an American serial killer who murdered three fellow American tourists in the Bahamas from December 1973 to January 1974. He was executed for his crimes.

Biography
Born James Michael Shoffner in Milwaukee, Shobek grew up with his mother Juanita Spencer, a cleaner at a Milwaukee school, without knowing his father. He caught a viral disease when he was two years old, suffering permanent brain damage from it. As an adult, he began working as a handyman, dreaming of one day becoming a songwriter. In November 1973, the then 17-year-old moved to the Bahamas to "bum around", changing his name to Michaiah Shobek.

Murders
On December 5, 1973, he murdered his first victim, 50-year-old Paul V. Howell, an attorney from Massillon, Ohio who was attending a convention. On Wednesday evening, Howell was in his hotel room, when he heard a knock on his door. Immediately upon opening it, he was stabbed in the chest and throat, killed instantly. Police suspected that he may have surprised burglars, and focused on that theory, while Howell's body was sent off for preparation of funeral services in his native Ohio.

On January 18 the following year, Shobek murdered his second victim — 44-year-old Irvin Bernstein from Ocean City, New Jersey, an accountant working for the Ministry of Fisheries. The man had arrived in Nassau from Miami through an Air Bahamas flight the previous day, with Shobek spotting him and offering a ride. He drove Bernstein from the airport, faking sexual advances to distract the man from noticing that they weren't going to the hotel.

When he stopped the car and pulled out his knife, Bernstein opened the door and tried to escape, but was caught and stabbed to death by his assailant. His body was discovered on Yamacraw Beach the next day, only with socks and shoes on, with multiple stab wounds. A pen and pair of sunglasses belonging to Shobek were found next to the body, and a black bag found in Paradise Island eight miles away from there contained some of Bernstein's papers and his killer's driver's license. When he was arrested later, Shobek was found to be in possession of Bernstein's pen.

On January 26, he murdered his final victim — 17-year-old student Katie Smith from Detroit, who was on a visit to the Bahamas with a group of other chaperoned students. The day before her murder, she had been seen walking with Shobek, and the following day, her body was found in a ditch by a cardboard box, apparently strangled to death.

Arrest, trial and execution
Shobek was eventually arrested for murdering Bernstein, but his trial was delayed, as there was a bank robbery investigation going on at the time. When it was resumed in 1975, he confessed to the other murders and pleaded insanity, claiming that they were "angels of Lucifer", and that he had murdered them by order from God. Shobek was convicted of murdering Bernstein and given a mandatory death sentence. Although he was initially scheduled to be hanged on October 8, he was granted an indefinite stay following an appeal filed by the United States Embassy, in which it was claimed that substantial information hadn't been supplied to the court.

During a psychiatric examination, the authorities learned that Shobek had travelled between the USA and the Bahamas for about two years. Whether he murdered other people during this period is unknown.

Shobek's execution date was moved to October 19, when he was to be executed at the Fox Hill Prison. The day before the hanging, a lawyer from the Legal Aid Society representing Shobek's mother had pleaded to then-president Gerald Ford to make a last-minute appeal, but the request was refused by a presidential aide. Michaiah Shobek was hanged, his death later being confirmed by the Investigation Department Chief Addington Darville. He was the first American to be hanged in the Bahamas in 15 years.

See also 
 List of serial killers by country

References

1954 births
1976 deaths
African-American people
American emigrants to the Bahamas
American people convicted of murder
American people executed abroad
Date of birth missing
Executed American serial killers
Male serial killers
People convicted of murder by the Bahamas
People executed by the Bahamas by hanging
People from Milwaukee